The Mystery Chef is an American cooking show that aired daily on NBC from March 1, 1949 to June 29, 1949. It was one of NBC's first daytime programs.

References

1949 American television series debuts
1949 American television series endings
NBC original programming
Black-and-white American television shows
American cooking television series
1940s reality television series